George-Adrian Ratiu (born 23 April 2000) is a Romanian swimmer. He competed in the men's 50 metre freestyle event at the 2018 FINA World Swimming Championships (25 m), in Hangzhou, China. In 2019, he represented Romania at the 2019 World Aquatics Championships in Gwangju, South Korea. He competed in the men's 50 metre butterfly and men's 50 metre freestyle events where he did not advance to compete in the semi-finals.

References

External links
 

2000 births
Living people
Romanian male butterfly swimmers
Romanian male freestyle swimmers
Place of birth missing (living people)
Swimmers at the 2018 Summer Youth Olympics